Andreas Faye (5 October 1802 – 5 May 1869) was a Norwegian priest, folklorist and historian.

He was born in the neighborhood of Bragernes (now Drammen) in Buskerud, Norway.  He was the son of Christopher Faye (1772–1825) and Maren Mathea Borgen. He graduated after studying theology at the University of Christiania (now University of Oslo) in 1828. Faye was appointed vicar of Holt at Tvedestrand in 1833 and from 1839 he was also dean of Christianssands Stifts Seminarium in Kristiansand.

He contributed to newspapers and magazines, and published a number of books, including the first folklore collection in Norway. Among his books are Norges Historie til Brug ved Ungdommens Underviisning from 1831, Norske Sagn from 1833, and Udtog af Norges Historie from 1834. He was elected to the Storting in 1842 from the constituency Nedenæs og Raabygdelagets Amt (now Aust-Agder) and was decorated as a Knight of the Order of St. Olav in 1866. In 1861, he was appointed  parish priest at Sande in Vestfold where he died in 1869.

References

1802 births
1869 deaths
People from Drammen
University of Oslo alumni
19th-century Norwegian Lutheran clergy
Norwegian folklorists
19th-century Norwegian historians
Members of the Storting
Aust-Agder politicians